NNS Bomadi (P176)  is an Ocea FPB 72 patrol boat operated by the Nigerian Navy.

Design

Operational history
On August 13, 2014, Bomadi captured , with a load of stolen crude oil.  Her crew of 20 were taken into custody. On August 19, Bomadi impounded a grounded barge, loaded with contraband oil.

References

Bomadi
Ships built in France